Kirtimukha (Sanskrit: कीर्तिमुख ,, also , a bahuvrihi compound translating to "glorious face") is the name of a swallowing fierce monster face with huge fangs, and gaping mouth, very common in the iconography of Hindu temple architecture in India and Southeast Asia, and often also found in Buddhist architecture.

Unlike other Hindu legendary creatures, for example the makara sea-monster, the kirtimukha is essentially an ornamental motif in art, which has its origin in a legend from the Skanda Purana and Shiva Purana - Yuddha khand of Rudra Samhita.

Origin and characteristics
 
The word mukha in Sanskrit refers to the face while kīrti means "fame, glory".  The story of Kirtimukha begins when a great king Jalandhara, who "by virtue of extraordinary austerities ... accumulated to himself irresistible powers." In a burst of pride, he sent forth his messenger, the monster Rahu, whose main task is eclipsing the moon, to challenge Shiva. "The challenge ... was that Shiva should give up his shining jewel of a bride Parvati." Shiva's immediate answer was to explode a tremendous burst of power from his third eye, which created a horrendous, emaciated, ravenous lion.  A terrified Rahu sought Shiva's mercy, which Shiva agreed to. But how then were they to feed the ravenous demon lion? "Shiva suggested that the monster should feed on the flesh of its own feet and hands." So Kirtimukha willingly ate his body starting with its tail as per Lord Shiva's order, stopping only when his face remained. Shiva, who was pleased with the result gave it the name Face of Glory and declared that it should always be at the door of his temples. Thus Kirtimukha is a symbol of Shiva himself.  

The Kirtimukha is often used as a motif surmounting the pinnacle of a temple or the image of a deity, especially in South Indian architecture. As Zimmer writes, "Kirtimukha serves primarily as an apotropaic demon-mask, a gruesome, awe-inspiring guardian of the threshold."

This face is sometimes confused with another sculptural element, the lion face (Simhamukha). However, in order to be a Kirtimukha it has to be engaged in swallowing, for the Kirtimukha is the figure of the "all consuming"

This monstrous face with bulging eyes sits also as an embellishment over the lintel of the gate to the inner sanctum in many Hindu temples signifying the reabsorption that marks the entry into the temple.  In Dravidian architecture and elsewhere it tops gavaksha (kudu, nasi) motifs.  Mostly it is only a face, indeed very often only the upper jaw and top of the face is visible, although in some places its arms are portrayed as well. The motif can also sometimes be found in Shiva's matted hair. 

Some authors have compared the Kirtimukha with the Greek myth of Ouroboros.

Gallery

See also
Bhavacakra
Rahu
Bhoma
Batara Kala

Notes

External links

Yalli & Mukha

Indian architectural history
Architectural elements
Hindu temple architecture
Hindu legendary creatures